South East Derbyshire was a parliamentary constituency in Derbyshire.  It returned one Member of Parliament to the House of Commons of the Parliament of the United Kingdom, elected by the first past the post voting system.

The constituency was created for the 1950 general election, and abolished for the 1983 general election.

Boundaries 
1950–1955: The Urban District of Long Eaton, and the Rural District of Shardlow.

1955–1974: The Urban District of Long Eaton, and the Rural District of Shardlow except the parishes included in the Derby North and Derby South constituencies (Chaddesden and Littleover).

1974–1983: The Urban District of Long Eaton, and the Rural District of South East Derbyshire.

Members of Parliament

Elections

Elections in the 1950s

Elections in the 1960s

Elections in the 1970s

See also
List of former United Kingdom Parliament constituencies
Unreformed House of Commons

References

Parliamentary constituencies in Derbyshire (historic)
Constituencies of the Parliament of the United Kingdom established in 1950
Constituencies of the Parliament of the United Kingdom disestablished in 1983